Bryotropha horribilis is a moth of the family Gelechiidae. It is found in eastern Turkey, northern Iran, Syria, Lebanon and Jordan.

The wingspan is 11–14 mm. The forewings are brown mixed with orange-brown. The hindwings are pale greyish brown, but darker towards the apex. Adults have been recorded on wing in June and July.

Etymology
The species name refers to the exclamation of one of the authors after the first glance at the male genitalia of this new species and is derived from Latin horribilis (meaning horrible or ghastly).

See also
 List of moths of Turkey
 List of moths of Iran

References

Moths described in 2005
horribilis
Moths of Asia